Andrew Hair Holm (4 November 1859 – 8 January 1934) was a Scottish footballer who played for Queen's Park and Scotland.

He won the Scottish Cup in 1881, 1882 and 1884 (the latter a walkover) and was selected for the Glasgow select team in addition to three international caps, but quit the game aged 24 to pursue business interests  – he worked as a distiller, and became a director of the company which produced White Horse whisky.

His elder brother John also played for Queen's Park, as well as for Corinthian in England.

See also
List of Scotland national football team captains

References

External links

1859 births
1934 deaths
Scottish footballers
Scotland international footballers
Queen's Park F.C. players
Businesspeople from Glasgow
Footballers from Glasgow
Association football fullbacks